His Musical Career (also known as Musical Tramp) is a 1914 American comedy silent film made by Keystone Studios starring Charlie Chaplin.

Synopsis
Charlie and his partner Mike work at a piano store, whose manager orders them to deliver a piano to Mr. Rich at 666 Prospect Street and repossess one from Mr. Poor at 999 Prospect Street. Hilarity ensues when they do exactly the opposite after mixing up the addresses of their customers.

Review
A reviewer from Variety gave it a positive review in November 1914, writing: "One of the best comedies in a month. Funny piano moving skit."

Cast
 Charlie Chaplin as Charlie the piano mover
 Mack Swain as Mike
 Charley Chase (as Charles Parrott) as Piano store manager
 Fritz Schade as Mr. Rich
 Cecile Arnold as Mrs. Rich
 Frank Hayes as Mr. Poor

See also
 List of American films of 1914

References

External links

 His Musical Career on YouTube

1914 films
1914 comedy films
Silent American comedy films
Short films directed by Charlie Chaplin
Films about pianos and pianists
American black-and-white films
American silent short films
Keystone Studios films
Films produced by Mack Sennett
1914 short films
Articles containing video clips
American comedy short films
1910s American films